The 1903–04 City Cup was the tenth edition of the City Cup, a cup competition in Irish football.

The tournament was won by Linfield for the eighth time and fifth consecutive year.

Group standings

References

1903–04 in Irish association football